Marmaroglypha pubescens is a species of beetle in the family Cerambycidae. It was described by Per Olof Christopher Aurivillius in 1898 and is known from the Philippines.

References

Lamiini
Beetles described in 1898